John Parker House may refer to:

in the United States
(by state)
John Parker House (Boise, Idaho), listed on the NRHP in Idaho
John Parker Tavern, in Bernardsville, New Jersey, listed on the NRHP in New Jersey
John P. Parker House in Ripley, Ohio, a U.S. National Historic Landmark
John W. Parker House, in Houston, Texas, listed on the NRHP in Texas

See also
Parker House (disambiguation)